The Eastwood Company is a seller of automotive restoration products, headquartered in Pennsylvania, United States. Founded in 1978, the company was started by Curt Stroker.  "Do-It-Yourself" and "Do the Jobs Right" are the mottos of the company.

History
Eastwood started in a garage in suburban Philadelphia in 1978, with the founder, Curt Strohacker, selling buffing wheels and compounds with tiny 1/4-page ads in automotive magazines. Today, the company staff works out of a distribution and headquarters facility in Pottstown, Pennsylvania, mailing millions of full-color catalogs annually, and running the Eastwood.com e-commerce website. In 2019, Kian Capital acquired Eastwood Company.

Expansion and growth
The first Eastwood catalog featured eight black and white pages of metal finishing equipment. By the early 1980s, the continued success took the catalog mailing operation into a professional list house. It reached 5,000 names by 1981 and kept growing. In addition to catalog marketing, Eastwood sold its products directly at selected car shows.

By 1984 and 1985, company ads would appear in more than fifty publications, including Hot Rod, Car Craft, and Popular Mechanics. The catalog prospered as well, growing to 96 pages with a four-color cover by 1986. Circulation reached more than 100,000 auto restorers, who received six issues per year.

By the end of the 1980s, the Eastwood customer file for custom and automotive restoration enthusiasts easily passed the half-million mark.

Products
Eastwood's assortment has grown to include over 5,000 products, including rust preventatives, specialty coatings, paints, chemicals, powder coating, welding and metal fabrication equipment, pressure blasters, and more.

Awards and recognition
 1998: The Pennsylvania Governor's award for "Environmental Excellence
 1999: Automotive Restoration Market Organization's "Best New Product"
 2011: Winner of Popular Mechanic's™ Magazine Editor's Choice Award for Product Innovation and Design
 2012: Winner of Popular Mechanic's Magazine Editor's Choice Award for MIG Spot Weld Kit

References

Companies based in Montgomery County, Pennsylvania
American companies established in 1978
1978 establishments in Pennsylvania
Privately held companies based in Pennsylvania